The A4148 is an A-class road in the town of Walsall, West Midlands, England.  It serves as the town's ring road, as it encircles the town centre, and no road inside it has a number.  Major junctions occur where it meets the A34, A454 and A461.

Rather than a purpose-built ring road, such as the nearby A4150 Wolverhampton Inner Ring Road, the A4148 consists of existing streets marked as a ring road.  Since 2006, Walsall Council has implemented a number of roadwork projects in an attempt to improve traffic flow. This included eliminating the large roundabout near the Arboretum which was replaced by traffic lights.

References

Roads in England
Transport in Walsall